Neil Forsyth (born 1978) is a Scottish author, television writer and journalist.

Early life 

Forsyth grew up in Dundee, Scotland where he attended the High School of Dundee and his first writing appeared in a Dundee United fanzine. He graduated from Edinburgh University and held several jobs including as a nightclub promoter before working as a freelance journalist. He is also a graduate of the New York Film Academy.

Books 

Forsyth's first book Other People's Money (2007) told the true story of the Scottish fraudster Elliot Castro. It received significant coverage and was well received though some newspapers questioned the book's moral purpose. "They thought it was wrong that we should profit from Elliot's crimes," Forsyth said, "But that's always something I protested against quite vigorously. Elliot was caught, and sentenced, and paid for his crimes." The film rights were purchased by the producers of The Last King of Scotland. In 2014 it was reported the book is being adapted for film by Crabtree Films with Forsyth writing the screenplay.

Forsyth has written four books featuring the fictional comic character Bob Servant: Delete This At your Peril (2007), Hero of Dundee (2010), Why Me? (2011), and Ask Bob (2015). In 2009 Irvine Welsh selected the then out of print Delete This at Your Peril as his choice in an Esquire Magazine poll for the Funniest Books Ever. On the book’s reissue, Barry Fantoni wrote "'I have worked with a lot of funny men – Peter Cook, Spike Milligan, Harry Enfield. Bob Servant is in a class of his own". In 2011, The Scotsman said “Bob Servant has attained national treasure status”  while the Press and Journal called Bob Servant "a modern Scottish comedy classic." Forsyth has noted the Dundonian poet William McGonagall as an influence for the character along with Harry Flashman.

After watching a medium perform in Edinburgh, Forsyth wrote the novel Let Them Come Through (2009). Forsyth researched the psychic world by attending live shows and speaking to experts including James Randi. Let Them Come Through was published in the UK and the United States and was praised for Forsyth's dark humour. Forsyth’s second novel, San Carlos (2014), is set in Ibiza in the 1980s and is a thriller following a reformed neo-Nazi seeking a new life. San Carlos was Book of the Week in the Daily Mirror while The Herald said that Forsyth had shown a “different side to his talents” in the "pacy, unpretentious thriller."

TV 

As Bob Servant he made the leap to television in early 2013 in the cult BBC Four comedy Bob Servant Independent which added Jonathan Watson and Rufus Jones to the existing radio cast. 

In 2016, Forsyth wrote four one-off Playhouses for Sky. Elizabeth, Michael & Marlon was based on the apocryphal story that on 9/11, Marlon Brando, Elizabeth Taylor and Michael Jackson hired a rental car and drove from New York to Ohio. The Playhouse was shot in late 2015, starring Brian Cox, Taylor and Joseph Fiennes. It also featured Carrie Fisher in one of her final roles. Before the planned 2017 transmission of the show adverse reaction to the casting of Fiennes as Jackson, particularly from Jackson’s daughter Paris Jackson, saw the show controversially pulled by Sky.

Forsyth’s Sky Playhouse, Waiting for Andre, concerned the real-life friendship between Samuel Beckett (David Threlfall) and a teenage Andre the Giant (Liam Macdonald). Observer called it a “gorgeous and sumptuous half-hour” and noted it was a “great shame Beckett himself didn’t get to enjoy this delightful slice of life”. Forsyth was nominated for a 2018 Writer’s Guild Award for Waiting For Andre in the Best Short Form TV Drama category. The series of Playhouses (Urban Myths) was nominated for an International Emmy.

In 2017, Forsyth wrote Eric, Ernie and Me, a one-off drama about Morecambe and Wise from the point of view of their writer Eddie Braben. It was broadcast on BBC4 on 29 December 2017 to a positive reception. The Observer said “What a lovely programme, rewatchable often”, while the Sunday Express said, “Eric, Ernie And Me was not just beautifully realised nostalgia…but a reminder of how difficult the creative process can be.” Eric, Ernie and Me was nominated for a number of awards, and Forsyth was nominated for a Royal Television Society Award for his writing of the show.

In 2019, Forsyth wrote and created Guilt, a BBC drama which premiered on the new BBC Scotland channel before being transmitted on BBC2. Guilt received high viewing figures, a positive critical reception and was included by a number of publications in their pick of the year’s television. The first series was nominated for a large number of awards and won Best Drama at the Scottish BAFTAs, The Royal Television Society of Scotland Awards, the Celtic Media Festival and the Broadcast Digital Awards. A well-received second series was broadcast in October 2021. 

On 5 June 2020, he teamed with Objective Fiction, a label of All3Media-owned Objective Media Group, to create a joint venture television drama production label named Tannadice Pictures.

In 2023 The Gold was announced to be broadcast on BBC One and Paramount+, written by Forsyth and produced by his Tannadice Pictures.

Film
In 2022, a Forsyth script about the life of Samuel Beckett was filmed by James Marsh and starring Gabriel Byrne with the working title Dance First.

References

External links 
 Neil Forsyth website
 Bob Servant website
 'Spam': El contraataque
 Com humor, escocês dá rasteira em golpistas da internet

Living people
1978 births
People educated at the High School of Dundee
Alumni of the University of Edinburgh
Journalists from Dundee
Scottish male writers
Writers from Dundee
21st-century Scottish writers